Garmab or Garmaab (also Romanized as Garmāb and Garm Āb) is a city in, and the capital of, Afshar District of Khodabandeh County, Zanjan province, Iran. At the 2006 census, its population was 3,274 in 772 households. The following census in 2011 counted 4,021 people in 965 households. The latest census in 2016 showed a population of 3,823 people in 1,037 households.

References 

Khodabandeh County

Cities in Zanjan Province

Populated places in Zanjan Province

Populated places in Khodabandeh County